Marina Tavares (born 17 November 1984) is a Brazilian former professional tennis player.

Biography
Tavares was born in the city of Maceió in Brazil's northeast. She was a top-100 junior in singles and made a Wimbledon semifinal for girls' doubles in 2002.

A right-handed player, Tavares only had success on the professional tour as a doubles player, with seven ITF titles, including a $50k title in Saguenay. She featured in the main draw of six WTA Tour tournaments, between 2004 and 2009.

She now runs her own tennis school for students in her home state of Alagoas.

ITF finals

Doubles (7–9)

References

External links
 
 

1984 births
Living people
Brazilian female tennis players
People from Maceió
South American Games medalists in tennis
South American Games gold medalists for Brazil
South American Games silver medalists for Brazil
Competitors at the 2002 South American Games
Sportspeople from Alagoas
20th-century Brazilian women
21st-century Brazilian women